Baylis v. Travelers' Insurance Company, 113 U.S. 316 (1885), was a case where after close of testimony in a trial, the defendant moved to dismiss on the ground of the insufficiency of the evidence to sustain a verdict. This motion was denied and the plaintiff asked that the case be submitted to the jury to determine the facts on the evidence. The court refused this, and plaintiff excepted. The court then ordered a verdict for plaintiff, subject to its opinion, whether the facts proved were sufficient to render defendant liable to plaintiff on the cause of action stated. Plaintiff moved for judgment on the verdict, and defendant moved for judgment on the pleadings and minutes of trial. Judgment was rendered for defendant upon an opinion of the court as to the effect of the evidence and as to the law on the facts as deduced from it by the court. Held that the plaintiff was thereby deprived of his constitutional right to a trial by jury, which he had not waived, and to which he was entitled.

Background
The case was an action brought by the plaintiff in error to recover upon a policy of insurance issued by the defendant, whereby it insured William Edward Parker Baylis, the father of the plaintiff, in the sum of $10,000, owed the plaintiff in case said assured should accidentally sustain bodily injuries which should produce death within ninety days.

The complaint alleged that the assured "on or about the 20th day of November 1872, did sustain bodily injuries accidentally, to-wit, in that wholly by accident he took certain drugs and medicines, which, as taken by him, were poisonous and deadly, when, in fact he intended to take wholly a different thing and in a different manner, and that, in consequence of said accident solely, said assured died on said 20th day of November 1872."

An issue was made by a denial in the answer of this allegation, so far as it alleged that the poisonous and deadly drugs were taken "accidentally, or by accident, or with the intent, or under the circumstances stated or mentioned in the complaint" to commit suicide.

Opinion
Justice Matthews delivered the opinion of the Court. He recited the facts and then continued:

In this particular, the court thought error was well assigned.  The right of trial by jury in the courts of the United States is expressly secured by the Seventh Amendment to the United States Constitution, and Congress has, by statute, provided for the trial of issues of fact in civil cases by the court without the intervention of a jury, only when the parties waive their right to a jury by a stipulation in writing. Rev.Stat. §§ 648, 649.

This constitutional right this Court has always guarded with jealousy. Elmore v. Grymes, 1 Pet. 469; DeWolf v. Rabaud, 1 Pet. 476; Castle v. Bullard, 23 How. 172; Hodges v. Easton, 106 U.S. 408.

For error in this particular, the judgment was reversed and the cause remanded with directions to grant a new trial.

See also
Travelers Casualty & Surety Co. of America v. Pacific Gas & Elec. Co. (2007)

References

External links

 

United States Supreme Court cases
United States Supreme Court cases of the Waite Court
United States Seventh Amendment case law
1885 in United States case law
The Travelers Companies
Drug overdose
Life insurance
Suicide in the United States